Frederick C. Martindale (December 18, 1865September 21, 1928) was a Michigan politician.

Early life
Martindale was born in Ontario, Canada on December 18, 1865. Martindale was born to parents Wales C. and Clara Martindale.

Career
Martindale was a lawyer. On January 2, 1901, Martindale as sworn in as a member Republican of the Michigan House of Representatives from the Wayne County 2nd district. He served in this position until 1902. In 1902, Martindale unsuccessfully ran for position of the member of the Michigan Senate from the 1st district. On January 4, 1905, Martindale was sworn in to this position, which he served in until 1908. Martindale served as Michigan Secretary of State from 1909 to 1914.

Personal life
Marindale married Mary Tireman.

Death
Martindale committed suicide via self-inflicted gunshot wound on September 21, 1928.

References

1865 births
1928 suicides
Burials at Woodlawn Cemetery (Detroit)
Secretaries of State of Michigan
Republican Party Michigan state senators
Republican Party members of the Michigan House of Representatives
20th-century American politicians
19th-century American lawyers
20th-century American lawyers
American politicians who committed suicide
Suicides by firearm in Michigan